Wattle Park is a public park in Melbourne, Australia, located in the suburb of Burwood. It is known for its plantation of 12,000 wattle trees. It is currently maintained by Parks Victoria.
The park provides public open space for recreation, as well as sporting facilities (accessed on a fee paying basis) and a wedding and function venue.

Location and facilities
Wattle Park is located in the Melbourne suburb of Burwood within the City of Whitehorse, approximately 13 km east of Melbourne's CBD. There are two children's playgrounds, BBQs, tables and seats. Two heritage 'W' Class trams offer shelter. The Wattle Park Chalet is located within the park. The Chalet has been used as a wedding venue and function centre since it opened in 1928. Oral sources suggest that this is the oldest continuously running wedding venue in Melbourne. Public toilets are located near Wattle Park Chalet on Monsborough Drive, the access road off Riversdale Road. There is a large grassed sports oval and a nine-hole public golf course with cafe, and public tennis courts are available by booking Wattle Park Golf Course. There are a number of walking tracks through the bush and a perimeter track. Dogs are permitted in the park on a lead.

Wattle Park Chalet
The Wattle Park Chalet was built in 1928 as a tea-house and function venue. It is an elegant structure in the rustic Tudor style of English architect Sir Edwin Lutyens. The Wattle Park Chalet was designed by Melbourne architect Alan Monsborough and is located at the centre of Wattle Park. The timber beams used for building the chalet were recycled from other, earlier structures. The roof slates came from the former Yarra Bend Asylum. Bricks came from cable tram engine-house chimneys. The front porch was added later, in 1937.

The construction of the chalet involved several sub-contractors. The Builders' Labourers' Federation stopped construction work on 7 March 1928, demanding higher pay. They returned to work approximately four weeks later at the same pay rate.

Two smaller single-storey wings branch off the chalet's main hall. The west wing originally contained the caretaker's residence, and the east wing contained the kitchen and kiosk. Between the wings was a paved courtyard. The paving was recycled from the former tramway engine house on Alexandra Avenue and old cable tram sheds.

Heritage and the Lone Pine
Approximately one-third of the park is recorded as a heritage place by Heritage Victoria, and the National Trust of Australia has also classified the park.

The "Lone Pine" tree growing near the main carpark is listed on the National Trust's Significant Tree Register, being one of the country's few original Lone Pines. The tree was grown from the seed of a cone collected by one of the Australian soldiers involved in the Gallipoli Campaign from the lone pine tree in Gallipoli, Turkey as a reminder of this notable battle and the ANZACs' involvement in World War I. Planted in Wattle Park on 8 May 1933 at the Trooping of the Colour by the 24th Battalion, the tree was the first Lone Pine to ever be publicly planted as an ANZAC memorial, pre-dating the one planted at Melbourne's Shrine of Remembrance by a month, and the one at the Australian War Memorial in Canberra by seventeen months.

Flora and fauna
The park contains areas of indigenous remnant bush land which has been identified as regionally significant. The Urban Fauna Survey Unit (Department of Conservation Forests and Lands, 1989) nominated the site as one of regional significance on the basis of its high diversity of common native fauna in a suburban environment.

There are recorded to be at least twenty species of butterfly, sixty species of beetle, three species of frogs, bats, skinks, ringtail and brushtail possums. The park's bird life includes kookaburras, rosellas, rainbow lorikeets, galahs, and gang-gang cockatoos.

History

The park was first created when the Hawthorn Tramway Trust (HTT) purchased 137 acres (554,000 m2) of land from Eliza Welch, under the condition it was to be used as a public park. the park was formerly the residence of the late Cr. Orlando Fenwick, who became Lord Mayor of Melbourne. It was known as Fenwick's Paddock when purchased for about £2500 by the late Mrs. Welch (proprietress of Ball and Welch Pty. Ltd.). The park opened on 31 March 1917 when Sir Arthur Stanley planted a Golden Wattle and named the park.

Due to the HTT's financial troubles, further development of the park was put off for some time. After the HTT had been amalgamated into the Melbourne & Metropolitan Tramways Board, it was put off due to work on electrifying Melbourne's cable tramways. Planning and development of the park started in the 1920s and 30s, with a plantation of 12,000 wattle trees planted in between 1926 and 1928 laid out in a wide belt as a hedge around the outskirts of the area. Lawns and flower beds were laid down, winding pathways built, and a small stream trickling through the centre of the park was cleaned and widened and. Fringed with willows and poplars. On the north eastern slopes, a splendid natural forest, consisting chiefly of poplars, gums, woolly butt and eucalyptus longifolia, was carefully preserved. The Wattle Park Chalet containing a cafe, dancing floor and other- amenities. considerable ingenuity was shown in the building of this chalet. Bricks from old tramway chimneys were extensively used, while the roof contained slates from the demolished Yarra Bend Asylum. Rafters and other timbers came from disused car barns, stones from old rookeries along Alexander-avenue, while the pavements of the promenade in front of the chalet and elsewhere were made from. broken slates from old- tramway engine houses and was completed in 1928 and served as a tea house for light refreshments and recreation, as well as a scenic wedding and function venue. Fencing posts around the boundaries of the park were manufactured from -old. tramway, rails, and a children's joy wheel was made from, a tramway 'cable wheel. The chalet was built, on the highest slope in the. park, about, 320 feet above sea level, and from its balconies a splendid panoramic view of Melbourne was obtained. Children's playgrounds were laid out, swings, joy wheels, a wading pool and other attractions installed. Cable car dummies were transformed into shelters and places where meals could be enjoyed. A sports oval was laid out alongside the chalet, along with two tennis courts. Facing Boundary-Road, (now Warrigal Road) was one of the most conspicuous spots in the park, a miniature lake planted with water lilies and stocked with goldfish. This lake used to be the dam of the old homestead. ("The Age" Sat 4 Feb 1933 p6).

A 9-hole golf course opened at Wattle Park in October 1937, with other facilities following later.

Most of the trees at Wattle Park were planted by Head Landscape Gardener and Curator of the park at that time, George William Tickner (later by deed poll George Nelson) who had built his own home at 14 Patterson Avenue, opposite the park. George was responsible for the planning, laying out, design and construction of the Tennis Courts, Golf Course, Pond, Lake, Paths, Walking Tracks, Sports Oval and many other structures in the park. Employed by the tramways board in the 1920s, Wattle Park became his life's work until he retired.
 
With the rise of popularity of motor cars in the 1960s and 70s, the MMTB (which was absorbed by the new Metropolitan Transit Authority in 1983) was focusing its attention elsewhere. Subsequently, local residents began to complain to the state government about the poor state of Wattle Park. In 1991, ownership of Wattle Park was passed from the Public Transport Corporation to the Melbourne & Metropolitan Board of Works, which undertook a program to rehabilitate the park's landscape.

Connection with trams

As Wattle Park, for most of its history, had been maintained by Melbourne's tram operators, it retains a connection with Melbourne's tramways. The Melbourne Tramways Band (no longer sponsored by Yarra Trams) plays at Wattle Park once a month during spring and autumn. The bodies of two W2 class trams are installed as shelters at Wattle Park, and tram route 70 runs along the park's northern boundary, with its terminus at the easternmost end of the park.

References

External links

 Parks Victoria: Wattle Park

Parks in Melbourne
Heritage sites in Melbourne
City of Whitehorse